Saeid Zibakalam is an Iranian academic and conservative political activist who self-identifies as a justice-seeker."

Education and career 
He gained a PhD in philosophy from University of Leeds in 1990, where he remained a visiting scholar for the next two years, before his return to Iran. He then worked as a research fellow at Institute for Humanities and Cultural Studies. Zibakalm is currently a faculty member at University of Tehran.

Selected published works

Political activities 
Zibakalam is a stauch supporter of Mahmoud Ahmadinejad and has openly criticized Hassan Rouhani and the Joint Comprehensive Plan of Action, having been categorized among delvaapasaan ("the concerned"). He was subsequently summend to the court in 2014 for criticizing the performance of the nuclear negotiating team. Zibakalam is one of the very few figures who openly attacks Judicial system of Iran. In 2020, he was among signatories of a letter to Ali Khamenei, that warned him of the current situation in Iran and questioned the compatibility of the measure taken by him to rule Iran. Zibakalam enrolled as a candidate for 2020 Iranian legislative election, however he was disqualified by the Guardian Council.

References 

Living people
1953 births
Alumni of the University of Portsmouth
Alumni of the University of Bradford
Alumni of the University of Leeds
Academics of the University of Leeds
Academic staff of the University of Tehran
Iranian political philosophers
20th-century Iranian philosophers
21st-century Iranian philosophers
People from Tehran
Iranian activists
Iranian diplomats
Iranian expatriates in the United Kingdom
Sociologists of science
Philosophers of science
Iran's Book of the Year Awards recipients